Rakauskaitė is a feminine form (unmarried) of Lithuanian surname Rakauskas. Notable people with the surname include: 

Daiva Rakauskaitė (born 1971), Lithuanian balloonist
Eglė Rakauskaitė (born 1967), Lithuanian visual artist
Giedrė Rakauskaitė (born 1991), British Paralympic rower

Lithuanian-language feminine surnames